Graham Powley Jarvis (August 25, 1930 – April 16, 2003) was a Canadian character actor in American films and television from the 1960s to the early 2000s.

Early years
Jarvis was born in Toronto, Ontario, the son of Margaret Biddulph (Scratcherd) and William Henry Reginald Jarvis, an investment banker and president of John Labatt Ltd. His maternal great-grandfather was businessman and brewer John Labatt, whose own father was Labatt founder John Kinder Labatt. He attended Williams College before moving to New York to pursue a career in theatre.

Career 
Jarvis starred in the television soap opera parody Mary Hartman, Mary Hartman as Charlie "Baby Boy" Haggers, the much older husband of wanna-be country music star Loretta Haggers, played by Mary Kay Place. He also appeared on other television programs such as Murder, She Wrote, Naked City, Route 66, N.Y.P.D., All in the Family, M*A*S*H, Mork & Mindy, Starsky and Hutch, Hart To Hart, Cagney and Lacey, Mama's Family, Fame, Married... with Children, Star Trek: The Next Generation, Get a Life, The X Files, ER, and Six Feet Under. He played character roles in several films.  His last major part was as "Charles Jackson", father of Annie Jackson Camden in the Warner Brothers TV drama 7th Heaven, a role that he filled until his death.

Jarvis acted in the role of Elliot Sinclair in The Journeyman Project trilogy of video games and was also the narrator in the first American production of The Rocky Horror Show at the Roxy Theatre in Los Angeles, playing alongside Meat Loaf and Tim Curry.

Personal life and death 
Jarvis lived in Los Angeles with his wife Joanna Jarvis. He had two sons, Lex and Matt. On April 16, 2003, he died from multiple myeloma and was interred at Pierce Brothers Valley Oaks Memorial Park in Westlake Village, California.

Filmography

 Bye Bye Braverman (1968) - Man on Bus (uncredited)
 Alice's Restaurant (1969) - Music Teacher
 End of the Road (1970) - Dr. Carter 
 The Out-of-Towners (1970) - Murray
 Move (1970) - Dr. Picker
 R. P. M. (1970) - Police Chief Henry J. Thatcher
 The Traveling Executioner (1970) - Doc Prittle
 Cold Turkey (1971) - Amos Bush
 A New Leaf (1971) - Bo
 The Organization (1971) - William Martin
 The Hot Rock (1972) - Warden
 What's Up, Doc? (1972) - Bailiff
 Witches of Salem: Horror and Hope (1972) - William Barker
 Russian Roulette (1975) - Benson
 Prophecy (1979) - Shusette
 Middle Age Crazy (1980) - J.D.
 The Amateur (1981) - Porter
 Mr. Mom (1983) - Humphries
 Deal of the Century (1983) - Babers
 Silkwood (1983) - Doctor at Union Meeting
 Draw! (1984) - Wally Blodgett
 The Chain (1984) - Foxx
 Mischief (1985) - Mr. Miller
 Doin' Time (1985) - Prescott
 One Magic Christmas (1985) - Frank Crump
 Weekend Warriors (1986) - Congressman Balljoy
 Tough Guys (1986) - Richie's Boss
 Do You Know the Muffin Man? (1989) - Judge Allen
 Parents (1989) - Mr. Zellner
 Murder, She Wrote - "The Sins of Castle Cove" (Season 2) (1989)
 Misery (1990) - Libby
 Star Trek: The Next Generation (1991) - Klim Dokachin
 Son in Law (1993) - Principal
 Trial by Jury (1994) - Mr. Duffy, Foreman
 Last of the Dogmen (1995) - Pharmacist
 The Sports Pages (2001) - Judge (segment "How Doc Waddems Finally Broke 100")
 7th Heaven (1996-2003, TV Series) - Charles Jackson (final appearance)

References

External links

 
 
 

1930 births
2003 deaths
Deaths from bone cancer
Canadian male film actors
Male actors from Toronto
Deaths from multiple myeloma
Deaths from cancer in California
Williams College alumni
Canadian male video game actors
Burials at Valley Oaks Memorial Park
Canadian expatriate male actors in the United States